Hebrew Book Week is an annual week-long event in Israel celebrating Hebrew literature.

History 
Hebrew Book Week evolved from a one-day event on Rothschild Boulevard in Tel Aviv organized by Bracha Peli, founder of Masada Press, to promote book sales in 1926.
 
During Hebrew Book Week, outdoor book fairs are held all over the country and publishing companies sell their books at a discount. Bookstores in Israel typically offer sales during this time which can last up to a month. In recent years, Hebrew Book Week has been extended to ten days.

Venues in Jerusalem have included the Israel Museum, Liberty Bell Park, Safra Square and the old Jerusalem Railway Station. The fair in Tel Aviv takes places at Rabin Square.

In addition to book sales, a variety of literary events are held during Book Week, such as get-togethers with authors and public readings. The award ceremony for the Sapir Prize take place during Hebrew Book Week.  There is also a heightened level of attention paid to literature in the media.

See also
Culture of Israel
Hebrew literature

References

External links
 Hebrew Book Week Homepage (web site in Hebrew)
 Ways To "Green" Hebrew Book Week
 Hebrew Book Week to open June 7, Yedioth Ahronoth
 Book Watch: 'For the sake of the book', The Jerusalem Post
 Annual Hebrew Book Week Report, National Library of Israel

June events
Hebrew language
Hebrew-language literature
Recurring events established in 1926
Book fairs in Israel
1926 establishments in Mandatory Palestine
Israeli culture